Haiku's Package Installer is a software installer for BeOS packages in PKG format. It provides an easy-to-use GUI that helps in fast package installation in Haiku. Haiku is a free and open-source operating system compatible with the now discontinued BeOS.

It is normally launched when the user double clicks any supported file. No settings are required for the Package Installer.

History 

Haiku's Participation in Google Summer Of Code 2007 brought good results. One of the tasks assigned was the creation of an installer for .PKG files, which would serve Haiku as a replacement for the old SoftwareValet application.<ref name=http://www.beosnews.com/2007/04/26/softwarevalet-replacement-in-progress/  This task was assigned to Lukasz Zemczak, who decided to change its functionality as well as the interface. He redesigned the user interface with usability improvements in mind. Zemczak defined the Package Installer as "It will be a simple .pkg package installer. It will be mostly based on the BeOS default pkg installer, offering a user friendly, lightweight interface. It will be written in C++, using the Haiku API."<ref name=https://web.archive.org/web/20071003030653/http://joomla.iscomputeron.com/index.php?option=com_content&task=view&id=991&Itemid=2 

Zemczak came up with a design which was much easier to use and much simpler. SoftwareValet was used before this package installer and Haiku's package installer was known to be a better version. More functions were added to it in order to come up with a much more efficient and effective installer.

Design 

It is executed automatically when any file with .pkg extension is selected.  First, there is a simple BMenuField which is renamed to a more appropriate 'Installation type' label. Users can select the type of Installation here. There might be more than one option depending on the developer. Then there is an Installation Location menu where the user can select any disc as the location of installation. The installation size and volume disk space information is included beside the two drop down menu choices, so that the user could know this info immediately after dropping down the menu. Pressing the Install button in the bottom right starts the installation process.

References 

Haiku